Hapoel Petah Tikva F.C. is an Israeli football club based in the city of Petah Tikva, currently playing in the Liga Leumit.
Its most successful period was throughout the 1950s and 1960s, in which the club won six League Championships and one State Cups. The club holds to this day the record for most consecutive championships - five - and was ranked in the top three of the league for 14 years between 1954 to 1968. Hapoel Petah Tikva did not win the championship since 1963, and its last titles were the State Cup in 1992, and the Toto Cup in 2005.

History

Pre-independence
Hapoel Petah Tikva was founded in 1926, and its football division was established in 1934. The club made it to the second league in 1938 and its first season in the top tier was 1941/42, two years after a new stadium was built in Abarbanel street. In 1945 the club first came close to winning a title after beating Maccbi Petah Tikva 7:0 in the Cup semi final, but lost 0:1 to Hapoel Tel Aviv in the final.
Some of the leading players in the 1940s were Meir Nevenhoiz, Amichai Shoham, Eliyahu Kroshar, Yaakov Visoker and Moshe Varon.

The Golden Age - 1954-1968
Hapoel Petah Tikva won its first championship in 1955, becoming the first team outside Tel Aviv to do so. The team was coached by Moshe Varon and the top scorer was the young rising star, Nahum Stelmach, with 28 goals in 26 games. A chance to win a double was missed out after making it to the Cup final, but losing 1:3 to Maccbi Tel Aviv.

Two year later, in 1957, Hapoel Petah Tikva won its first state cup after beating Maccbi Yaffo 2:1 in the final. In 1959, after three consecutive years in second place, the team finally won its second championship. This was the first out of five back to back championships, a record no team in Israel has achieved again. Some of the leading players during these years were Nahum Stelmach, Yaakov Visoker, Boaz Koffman, Zakharia Ratzabi, Avshalom Ratzabi, Reuven Yeffet and Jerry Haledy. The coaches were all foreign - Jackie Gibbons (England), Ignác Molnár (Hungary) and Miodrag Jovanović (Yugoslavia).

The streak ended in 1964, but in the following years Hapoel Petah Tikva was still one of the strongest teams in Israel. The last season of this era was 1968, where the team ranked second and lost in the Cup Final to Bnei Yehuda. During the 14 years period, Hapoel Petah Tikva won six championships, never dropped below the third place, and made it to five cup finals (one win and four losses).

The Descent - 1969-1987
In 1969 Hapoel Petah Tikva found itself at the lower part of the table for the first time since making it to the first league. The leading players have retired, and during the first half of the 1970s was no longer a contender and even faced danger of relegation a couple of times. The only chance for a title during these year was in 1974, when the team made it to the cup final but lost to Hapoel Haifa. The semi final against Beitar Jerusalem, which took place in Petah Tikva one week earlier, was one of the most violent ones in the history of Israeli Football, with the supporters of Beitar invading the pitch and attacking Hapoel players and supporters.

In 1976 Hapoel Petah Tikva dropped to the second league for the first time ever. This was an extremely unlucky relegation - the only time in the Israeli League with four teams relegating, and Hapoel was the fourth one after an extremely close race and losing in the final match of the season.

The club spent three long years in the second league until finally promoting back to the first league in 1979. Three years later, in 1982, Hapoel Petah Tikva was ranked last in the league and relegated again. This time it took two year until the promotion in 1984. Around this time the club first showed signs of recovering, with Giora Spiegel and Dror Bar Nur as managers building a firm base for the upcoming years.

Recovery - 1988-2002
Towards the end of the 80s, Hapoel Petah Tikva became once again one of the leading football clubs in Israel. Avram Grant led the team for five seasons, starting at 1987. Between 1989 to 1991 Hapoel was on the brink of winning a seventh championship after over 25 years, but ended up in second place three times in a row. In 1991 it was an extremely close call, with one point missing to top Maccabi Haifa. 2 matches prior the end of that season, the 2 clubs met for a critical match in which 2 goals scored by Hapoel were called void by Haim Livkovich, the referee. Later on, after the game was ended 0:0, the 2 goals were proven to be valid but unfortunately this was too late for Hapoel that missed the league championship as a result.

In the following year the team dropped to the fourth place, but finally won a major trophy again, after beating Maccabi Tel Aviv in the state cup final, 3:1. Following that Hapoel Petah Tikva became the first Israeli team to participate in UEFA Cup Winners’ Cup. It also became the first Israeli team to beat a major European club in any UEFA contest, with a 2:1 victory over Feyenoord (but knocked out due to a 0:1 loss in the away game).

In 1996 the club was purchased by the businessman Meir Shamir. In 1997 Hapoel Petah Tikva was ranked second in the league once again, and competed in UEFA Cup for the first time.
Another good season was in 2000, where the team competed for the championship, but ended up ranking third. 
Overall the club seemed to be in a strong position in that era, being ranked at the top half of the league in 14 out of 15 seasons, with a strong players base and good youth teams. However, that did not last much longer.

Bankruptcy and Relegations - 2003-2015
Starting at 2003 the team became gradually weaker. Homegrown players were being sold to other clubs, and every year a larger portion of the squad was being replaced. In 2007 Hapoel Petach Tikva was relegated to the second league after 23 consecutive years in the first league. The club managed to get promoted the following year, but was extremely poorly managed at this point.

In the summer of 2011 the poor management proved to be even worse than expected, when large debts were discovered and the club filed for bankruptcy. The team started the season with a 9 points deduction, which led to another relegation. In 2014 the team was promoted back, but faced relegation once again in the following season.

Second League and Fans Ownership - 2016-Present Day
The following years were even worse, with the team struggling in the second league. In the summer of 2018, seven years after the first time, the club declared bankruptcy once again. Therefore the team started the 2019 season with a point deduction of 11 points, but still managed to avoid relegation.

In March 2019 Hapoel Petah Tikva became a fans-owned team, after the supporters' trust named The Blue bought the club. This did not prevent an awful season in 2021 which ended with a relegation to the third league for the first time in history. However, the team ended up staying in the second league due to financial trouble in Hapoel Iksal.

Stadium
The home ground of Hapoel Petah Tikva is HaMoshava Stadium which opened at the end of 2011, and replaced Petah Tikva Municipal Stadium as the home ground of the team.

Current squad

Honours

League

Cup competitions

Managers

 David Wagner (1934–36)
 Shimon Ratner (1937–39)
 Morris Elazar (1939–41)
 Shlomo Poliakov (1942–46)
 Moshe Poliakov (1947–52)
 Moshe Varon (1952–53)
 Moshe Poliakov (1953)
 Moshe Varon (1953–54)
 Moshe Poliakov (1954)
 Moshe Varon (1954–56)
 Jackie Gibbons (1956–57)
 Eliezer Spiegel (1957–58)
 Jackie Gibbons (1958–60)
 Ignác Molnár (1960–61)
 Miodrag Jovanović (1961–63)
 Slavko Milošević (1963–64)
 Edmond Schmilovich (1964–66)
 Béla Pálfi (1966–67)
 Nahum Stelmach (1967–69)
 Milovan Beljin (1969–72)
 Rehavia Rosenbaum (1972–73)
 Boaz Kofman (1973–75)
 Arie Redler (1975–76)
 Boaz Kofman (1976–77)
 Aharon Kapitolnik (1977–78)
 Amnon Raz (1978)
 Michael Sheinfeld (1978–79)
 Zvi Singel (1979–80)
 Shimon Shenhar (1980)
 Amatsia Levkovich (1980–81)
 Itzhak Schneor (1981–82)
 Boaz Kofman (1982)
 Aharon Kapitolnik (1982–83)
 Giora Spiegel (1983–86)
 Avram Grant (July 1, 1986 – June 30, 1991)
 Ze'ev Seltzer (1991–92)
 Ján Pivarník (1992–93)
 David Schweitzer (1993)
 Moshe Meiri (1993–94)
 Dov Remler (1994)
 Guy Levy (July 1, 1994 – June 30, 1996)
 Nir Levine (1996–98)
 Giora Spiegel (1998–99)
 Nir Levine (1999–00)
 Eli Cohen (July 1, 2000 – June 30, 2001)
 Eli Guttman (2001–02)
 Nir Levine (2002)
 Freddy David (2003–05)
 Dror Kashtan (July 1, 2004 – June 30, 2005)
 Rafi Cohen (2005)
 Nir Levine (2005–06)
 Eyal Lahman (2006–07)
 Uri Malmilian (2007–08)
 Eli Mahpud (Feb 20, 2008 – April 9, 2009)
 Danny Nir'on (July 1, 2009 – Nov 23, 2009)
 Shavit Elimelech (Nov 22, 2009 – Dec 16, 2009)
 Eli Mahpud (Dec 16, 2009 – Oct 16, 2010)
 Yuval Naim (Oct 16, 2010 – April 13, 2011)
 Gili Landau (Aug 17, 2011 – May 13, 2012)
 Eli Mahpud (Aug 14, 2012–13)
 Alon Mizrahi (2013)
 Nissan Yehezkel (2013–14)
 Idan Bar-On (2014–15)
 Meni Koretski (2015–16)
 Guy Tzarfati (2016)
 Felix Naim (2016)
 Asaf Nimni (2016)
 Yaron Hochenboim (2016–2017) 
 Oren Krispin (2017)
 Dani Golan (2017–2018)
 Tomer Kashtan (2018)
 Messay Dego (2018–2019)
 Amir Nussbaum (2019–2020)
 Messay Dego (2020)
 Haim Shabo (2020–2021)
 Klemi Saban (2021)
 Ofer Talsepapa (2021–)

References

External links
Academy WebSite  
Hapoel Petach Tikva Museum 

 
Association football clubs established in 1934
Petah Tikva
Petah Tikva
1934 establishments in Mandatory Palestine
Sport in Petah Tikva